Hyperion with Higgins is an album by jazz saxophonist Charles Lloyd recorded in December 1999 by Lloyd with Brad Mehldau, John Abercrombie, Larry Grenadier and Billy Higgins. The album is a dedication to Higgins who died in May 2001. Additional tracks recorded at these sessions were released as The Water Is Wide in 2000.

Reception
The Allmusic review by David R. Adler awarded the album 4 stars calling it an "exceptionally focused, all-original statement from Charles Lloyd". The All About Jazz review by Nils Jacobson stated "The tunes on Hyperion tend to reflect a warm, spiritual energy, though the pulse fairly leaps out in places... It's a beautifully spiritual record, led by a visionary who has cultivated and expanded his own voice for over two decades—and stitched together by a cast of extremely talented and sympathetic characters. Higgins's work here deserves special note; but then again, he always was head and shoulders above his peers. The high drama of Hyperion offers a wide range of emotional intensity. This disc is a must-listen if you liked Water is Wide. Highly recommended!". 
In another review for the same website Mark Corroto stated "Lloyd’s sound just seems to get better with each session. He neither strains nor sweats here laying down graceful passages... Like Coltrane, Lloyd utilizes passion within the confines of his own lyricism. This is a wondrous session".

Track listing
All compositions by Charles Lloyd

 "Dancing Waters, Big Sur to Bahia" - 5:55
 "Bharati" - 7:01
 "Secret Life of the Forbidden City" - 10:05
 "Miss Jessye" - 10:24
 "Hyperion With Higgins" - 7:20
 "Darkness on the Delta Suite: Mother Where Art Thou/Robert Johnson on the Banks of the Ganges/Perseverance/Till the River Runs Free/Peace in the Storm" - 12:40
 "Dervish on the Glory B" - 8:24
 "The Caravan Moves On" - 8:32

Personnel
Charles Lloyd – tenor saxophone
John Abercrombie – guitar
Brad Mehldau – piano
Larry Grenadier – bass
Billy Higgins – drums

References

2001 albums
ECM Records albums
Charles Lloyd (jazz musician) albums
Albums produced by Manfred Eicher